Bently, also spelled Bentley, is an unincorporated community in Calhoun County, Mississippi, United States.

History
Bently was first settled in 1844 and named for the Bentley family. It was formerly home to a general store and school.
A sawmill was moved from Arbor Grove in Chickasaw County, Mississippi to Bently.

A post office operated under the name Bently from 1877 to 1909.

References

Unincorporated communities in Calhoun County, Mississippi
Unincorporated communities in Mississippi